Cork West was a parliamentary constituency represented in Dáil Éireann, the lower house of the Irish parliament or Oireachtas from 1923 to 1961. The constituency elected 5 (and later 3) deputies (Teachtaí Dála, commonly known as TDs) to the Dáil, on the system of proportional representation by means of the single transferable vote (PR-STV).

History 
It was created in 1923 as a 5-seat constituency, a partial replacement for the 8 seat Cork Mid, North, South, South East and West constituency. It was first used for the 1923 general election to the 4th Dáil.

It was reduced to a 3 seater for the 1948 general election to the 12th Dáil, and remained at that size until its abolition for the 1961 general election to the 17th Dáil. It was then partially replaced by the new Cork South-West constituency.

Boundaries 
It consisted of the county electoral areas of Bandon, Bantry and Dunmanway in the administrative county of Cork.

TDs

Elections

1957 general election

1954 general election

1951 general election

1949 by-election 
Following the death of the Labour Party TD Timothy J. Murphy, a by-election was held on 15 June 1949. The seat was won by the Labour Party candidate William J. Murphy.

1948 general election

1944 general election

1943 general election

1938 general election

1937 general election

1933 general election

1932 general election

September 1927 general election

June 1927 general election

1923 general election 
There is no record of Buckley's surplus having been distributed, even though it was greater than the difference between the votes of Murphy and Kelly.

See also 
Dáil constituencies
Politics of the Republic of Ireland
Historic Dáil constituencies
Elections in the Republic of Ireland

References

External links 
Oireachtas Members Database

Dáil constituencies in the Republic of Ireland (historic)
Historic constituencies in County Cork
1923 establishments in Ireland
1961 disestablishments in Ireland
Constituencies established in 1923
Constituencies disestablished in 1961